The Katara is a spicy sauce typically made in the Venezuelan Amazon. It is made by the natives with chilli pepper and giant (Bachaco – Atta laevigata) bottom.
The spicy sauces are always served on the side.

See also
 Atta laevigata

References 
 Katara, sabor del Amazonas | http://www.directoalpaladar.com/ingredientes-y-alimentos/katara-sabor-del-amazonas
 Local traditions and culture in Venezuela | Hot Stuff ! | http://www.virtualtourist.com/travel/South_America/Venezuela/Local_Customs-Venezuela-MISC-BR-3.html
 Venezuela, 5th: The Bradt Travel Guide (Russell Maddicks) Published by Bradt Travel Guide 2011

Notes 

Chili sauce and paste